"Chained to the Wheel" is a song by Australian blues and rock band The Black Sorrows. It was released as the third single from their fifth studio album Hold On to Me. It was a big hit, peaking at 9 on the ARIA Charts.

At the ARIA Music Awards of 1990, the song was nominated for Single of the Year, losing to "Crying in the Chapel" by Peter Blakeley, and Song of the Year, losing to "Tucker's Daughter" by Ian Moss.

Track listing
7" single (CBS 654548 7)
 "Chained to the Wheel" – 3:57
 "Waiting for the Rain" – 5:02

Charts

Weekly charts

Year-end charts

Certification

Cover versions
 In 1991, John Denver covered this song on his album, Different Directions.
 In 2006, Vika and Linda Bull re-recorded an acoustic version for their album Between Two Shores.

References

CBS Records singles
Songs written by Joe Camilleri
Song recordings produced by Joe Camilleri
The Black Sorrows songs
Songs about truck driving